Solbrig is a surname. Notable people with the surname include:

Inge Solbrig (born 1944), German actress and voice actress
Karl August von Solbrig (1809–1872), German physician and psychiatrist
Otto Thomas Solbrig (born 1930), Argentinian evolutionary biologist and botanist
Sven Solbrig, German paralympic athlete